Gremiasco is a comune (municipality) in the Province of Alessandria in the Italian region Piedmont, located about  southeast of Turin and about  southeast of Alessandria.

Gremiasco borders the following municipalities: Bagnaria, Brignano-Frascata, Cecima, Fabbrica Curone, Montacuto, Ponte Nizza, San Sebastiano Curone, and Varzi.

References

Cities and towns in Piedmont